The Estonian Islamic Centre is a mosque in Lasnamäe District, Tallinn, Harju County, Estonia.

The Estonian Islamic Centre was established in 2008 by the Estonian Islamic Congregation, a non-profit organization that represents the Muslim community in Estonia. The centre is open to people of all faiths and backgrounds and serves as a place for prayer, cultural events, and educational activities.

Architecture
The mosque is housed in an office block in the city's Lasnamäe district.

Transportation
The mosque is accessible within walking distance southeast of Ülemiste Station of Elron.

See also
 Islam in Estonia

References

Mosques in Estonia
Religious buildings and structures in Tallinn